Health Canada (HC) is the department of the Government of Canada responsible for national health policy. The department itself is also responsible for numerous federal health-related agencies, including the Canadian Food Inspection Agency (CFIA) and the Public Health Agency of Canada (PHAC), among others. These organizations help to ensure compliance with federal law in a variety of healthcare, agricultural, and pharmaceutical activities. This responsibility also involves extensive collaboration with various other federal- and provincial-level organizations in order to ensure the safety of food, health, and pharmaceutical products—including the regulation of health research and pharmaceutical manufacturing/testing facilities.

The department is responsible to Parliament through the minister of health—presently Jean-Yves Duclos—as part of the federal health portfolio. The minister is assisted by the associate minister of health, and minister of mental health and addictions—presently Carolyn Bennett. The deputy minister of health, the senior most civil servant within the department, is responsible for the day-to-day leadership and operations of the department and reports directly to the minister.

Originally created as the "Department of Health" in 1919—in the wake of the Spanish flu crisis—what is known as Health Canada today was formed in 1993 from the former Health and Welfare Canada department (established in 1944), which split into two separate units; the other department being Human Resources and Labour Canada.

Organization
Health Canada's leadership consists of:

 Minister of Health
 Deputy Minister
 Associate Deputy Minister

Branches 
The following branches, offices, and bureaus (and their respective services) fall under the jurisdiction of Health Canada:
Health Canada
Office of Audit and Evaluation
Departmental Audit Committee
Director General / Chief Audit Executive's Office
Internal Audit and Special Examinations
Program Evaluation Division
Performance Measurement Planning and Integration
Practice Management
Chief Financial Officer Branch
Departmental Performance Measurement and Evaluation Directorate
Departmental Resource Management Directorate
Financial Operations Directorate
Internal Control Division
Materiel and Assets Management Directorate
Planning and Corporate Management Practices Directorate
Communications and Public Affairs Branch
Ethics and Internal Ombudsman Services
Marketing and Communications Services Directorate
Planning and Operations Division
Public Affairs and Strategic Communications Directorate
Stakeholder Relations and Consultation Directorate
Controlled Substances and Cannabis Branch
Corporate Services Branch
Departmental Secretariat
Health Products and Food Branch
Assistant Deputy Minister’s Office
Biologics and Genetic Therapies Directorate
Food Directorate
Marketed Health Products Directorate
Medical Devices Directorate
Natural and Non-prescription Health Products Directorate
Office of Nutrition Policy and Promotion
Policy, Planning and International Affairs Directorate
Resource Management and Operations Directorate
Therapeutic Products Directorate
Veterinary Drugs Directorate
Healthy Environments and Consumer Safety Branch
Consumer and Hazardous Products Safety Directorate
Environmental and Radiation Health Sciences Directorate
Policy Planning and Integration Directorate
Safe Environments Directorate
Climate Change and Innovation Bureau
Water and Air Quality Bureau 
New Substances Assessment and Control Bureau
Existing Substances Risk Assessment Bureau
Legal Services
Opioid Response Team
Controlled Substances Directorate
Opioid Response Team Directorate
Pest Management Regulatory Agency
Regulatory Operations and Enforcement Branch
Strategic Policy Branch

Partner agencies
In their responsible of maintaining and improving the health of Canadians, the Minister of Health is supported by the Health Portfolio, which comprises Health Canada as well as:

 Public Health Agency of Canada;
 Canadian Institutes of Health Research;
 the Patented Medicine Prices Review Board; and 
 the Canadian Food Inspection Agency
Additionally, Health Canada is a corporate partner of the Canadian Association of Emergency Physicians (CAEP).

International collaboration 
In December 2016, Health Canada approved the purchase of a new botulism antitoxin called heptavalent botulism antitoxin (BAT) from the American-based company Emergent Biosolutions, a global specialty biopharmaceutical company. The PHAC has identified botulism as a likely biological terrorist threat.

Labs and offices

Offices 
Office of the Cameron Visiting Chair
Office of the Chief Dental Officer
The National Office of WHMIS
Nurse Recruitment
Public Services Health Medical Centre

Laboratories 
Laboratory Centre for Disease Control
Sir Frederick G Banting Research Centre

Compliance and Enforcement Directorate 
The Compliance and Enforcement Directorate provides support to Health Canada by enforcing the laws and regulations pertaining to the production, distribution, importation, sale, and/or use of consumer products, including but not limited to: tobacco, pest control materials, drugs and medical devices, biologics, and natural health products.

The Directorate conducts inspections and investigations to ensure that products are safe, of good quality, and properly labelled and distributed, in order to better protect Canadians from potentially harmful products and consumables.

Compliance and Enforcement Directorate is divided into six distinct programs:

Canada Vigilance Program
Controlled Substances Program
Inspectorate Program
Pesticide Compliance Program
Product Safety Program
Tobacco Control Program

Related legislation
Acts for which Health Canada has total or partial responsibility:
 Assisted Human Reproduction Act
 Canada Health Act
 Canadian Centre on Substance Abuse Act
 Canadian Environmental Protection Act
 Canadian Institutes of Health Research Act
 Cannabis Act
 Controlled Drugs and Substances Act
 Comprehensive Nuclear Test-Ban Treaty Implementation Act
 Department of Health Act
 Financial Administration Act
 Fitness and Amateur Sport Act
 Food and Drugs Act
 Hazardous Materials Information Review Act
 Hazardous Products Act
 Patent Act
 Pest Control Products Act
 Pesticide Residue Compensation Act
 Quarantine Act
 Radiation Emitting Devices Act
 Tobacco Act & Act to Amend the Tobacco Act (sponsorship)

Acts which Health Canada is involved or has special interest in:
 Broadcasting Act
 Canada Labour Code
 Canada Medical Act
 Canada Shipping Act
 Canadian Food Inspection Agency Act
 Emergency Preparedness Act
 Energy Supplies Emergency Act
 Excise Tax Act
 Federal-Provincial Fiscal Arrangements Act
 Feeds Act
 Immigration and Refugee Protection Act
 National Parks Act
 Nuclear Safety and Control Act
 Non-Smokers Health Act
 Queen Elizabeth II Canadian Research Fund Act
 Trade Marks Act

Special access program
Health Canada has a special access program that health care providers may use to request medications that are not currently commercially available in Canada.

COVID-19 response
The chief medical advisor of Health Canada, Dr. Supriya Sharma, as of April 2021, oversees the COVID-19 vaccine approval process in Canada.  On 29 March 2021, Dr. Sharma supported the National Advisory Committee on Immunization's declaration of a pause for the administration of the AstraZeneca vaccine to Canadians under the age of 55.

Criticisms
An editorial published by the Canadian Medical Association Journal has called for Health Canada to more strictly regulate natural health products. The editorial cited weaknesses in current legislation that allow natural health products to make baseless health claims, to neglect side-effects research prior to products reaching market, and to be sold without being evaluated by Health Canada.

On 10 September 2012, a report on CBC Television questioned the safety of drugs sold in North America. The Canadian Press reported that Health Canada is secretive regarding inspections about drugs manufactured overseas, leaving the public unsure about the safety of these drugs.

Drug approvals process 
Health Canada aims to provide responses to pharmaceutical innovators within 300 days of submitting a drug for review. However, for submissions filed between 2015 and 2019, only 33 percent received a response within that target. Fully 18 percent waited over a year, and almost 5 percent over two years. The average delay for a standard review was 335 days. Health Canada’s accelerated pathway for approval dubbed “conditional compliance” reduces its target timeline to 200 days, but its actual average delay was still 302 days, and only 8 percent of applicants received responses within the 200-day target.

It has been suggested that government entities should make use of rolling submissions, as was done for COVID-19 vaccines, to proceed with the examination of partially complete submissions and accept new information as it becomes available, and also that drugs already approved in other jurisdictions should be approved more rapidly to avoid redundancy.

See also
Health care in Canada
Public Health Agency of Canada
 First Nations Health Authority

International counterparts 

U.S. Department of Health and Human Services (HHS)
Centers for Disease Control and Prevention (CDC)
Food and Drug Administration (FDA)
European Medicines Agency (EMA)
Japanese Ministry of Health, Labour and Welfare (MHLW)
National Centre for Disease Control (NCDC)

Notes

References

External links

 

 
Medical and health organizations based in Canada
Federal departments and agencies of Canada
Canada
Public health organizations
Regulators of biotechnology products
Ministries established in 1996
Regulation of medical devices
Federal law enforcement agencies of Canada
1996 establishments in Canada